This is the list of awards and nominations received by Roger Sanchez, whose career in electronic dance music both as a DJ, Remixer and Music Producer has spanned over 20 years.

Amongst his major competitive awards, Sanchez has won a Grammy Award, four DJ Awards, one International Dance Music Award and been nominated for an MTV Music Award overall in his career to date he has won 6 competitive awards from 26 nominations.

Awards and nominations

Grammy Awards

MTV Europe Awards
The MTV Europe Music Award for Best Dance was first awarded in 1994 and was given every year until 2003, and it was one of the original two genre categories that were added to the MTV Europe Music Awards that year it was re-instated as an award in 2012.

DJ Awards
The DJ Awards organizes the annual electronic music DJ awards event it is the only international ceremony for DJs and also the oldest, the awards are held once a year at Pacha club in Ibiza Spain it is one of the most important accolades an artist can win or be honoured by.

Sanchez has won the Best House DJ Award 4 times and received 12 nominations in the same category.

|}

International Dance Music Awards

In March 2007, Sanchez won the Best Podcast Award he has received a total of 12 IDMA nominations in different categories including 8 for Best American DJ, 1 for Best Global DJ, 1 for Best Producer and 1 for Best Remixer.

References

External links
Official Website

Sanchez, Roger
Sanchez, Roger